Twelveheads Press  is an independent publishing company based in Chacewater near Truro, Cornwall, UK. Best known for their Cornish Heritage series but also well known by scholars and enthusiasts for their transport and mining books: the firm takes its name from the hamlet of Twelveheads.

History and philosophy
Founded by Michael Messenger and John Stengelhofen, Twelveheads have been producing high quality books for over 25 years. Their specialist books include topics such as maritime, mining and railway history, and mostly cover the areas of Cornwall and Southwest Britain. In 1988 Messenger and Stengelhofen were joined by Alan Kittridge and all three have contributed significantly to their titles

Michael Messenger states: 
"Twelveheads Press is not a conventional publishing house in the usual sense, but three friends who publish subjects that interest us. Our knowledge ensures that the books are authentic and accurate. Whilst we try not to lose money on books because we do not rely on Twelveheads Press for our living we can afford to reject manuscripts that are not to the standards we want and expect. It is only the support of the reading public that has kept us in business for over 30 years."

Titles for Cornwall County Council
The following titles were produced by Historic Environment Service (formerly Cornwall Archaeological Unit) for Cornwall County Council
Scilly's Archaeological Heritage
Cornwall's Archaeological Heritage
Cornwall's China Clay

Railway titles
Twelveheads titles focus on studies of railways in Cornwall, Devon and Wales
 
 Slate Quarry Railways of Gwynedd 
 North Devon Clay
 Industrial Railways of the South West
 The Redlake Tramway & China Clay Works E. A. Wade
 Caradon & Looe : The Canal, Railways and Mines
 Brunel's Royal Albert Bridge
 The Lee Moor Tramway
 The Plynlimon and Hafan Tramway E. A. Wade
 Devonport Dockyard Railway
 The Culm Valley Light Railway
 Cornwall's Railway Heritage
 The Mont Cenis Fell Railway

Maritime titles
 Railway Ships & Packet Ports 
 T. R. Brown of Bristol 
 Cosens of Weymouth; 1918 to 1996 
 White Funnel Magic 
 Lundy Packets 
 Steamers & Ferries of the River Tamar & Three Towns District 
 Passenger Steamers of the River Fal
 Douglas Head Ferry & the Port Soderick Boats
 Plymouth; Ocean Liner Port of Call 
 Tacky's Tug 
 Rendel's Floating Bridges   
 Bishop Rock Lighthouse

Mining titles
 Mines of Cornwall & Devon 
 Tin Streams of Wendron
 The Kalmeter Journal Henric Kalmeter (1693-1750) made this journal on a visit to Cornwall, Devon and Somerset in 1724-25. It was translated from the Swedish by Justin Brooke.

Cornwall's Heritage
 Cornwall's Archaeological Heritage
 Cornwall's Bridge & Viaduct Heritage
 Cornwall's Churchyard Heritage
 Cornwall's Geological Heritage
 Cornwall's Industrial Heritage
 Cornwall's Lifeboat Heritage
 Cornwall's Lighthouse Heritage
 Cornwall's Literary Heritage
 Cornwall's Maritime Heritage 
 Cornwall's Mining Heritage
 Cornwall's Railway Heritage

Standard Book Number
The Twelveheads Press has the following 13-digit ISBN code: 978 0 906294 (followed by xxx y)

References

External links

 Company website

Book publishing companies of the United Kingdom
Publishing companies established in 1977
Small press publishing companies
Companies based in Cornwall
Cornish literature
1977 establishments in the United Kingdom